(Thomas) Edison Irigei was a long serving Anglican bishop who was Bishop of Kumi in Uganda during the first two decades of the 21st century.

References

21st-century Anglican bishops in Uganda
Anglican bishops of Kumi
Uganda Christian University alumni